Wang Jinfen (born 27 July 1969) is a Chinese biathlete. She competed at the 1992 Winter Olympics and the 1994 Winter Olympics. She also competed in two cross-country skiing events at the 1988 Winter Olympics.

She is the older sister of teammate Wang Jinping.

References

1969 births
Living people
Biathletes at the 1992 Winter Olympics
Biathletes at the 1994 Winter Olympics
Cross-country skiers at the 1988 Winter Olympics
Chinese female biathletes
Chinese female cross-country skiers
Olympic biathletes of China
Olympic cross-country skiers of China
Place of birth missing (living people)
Asian Games medalists in biathlon
Asian Games medalists in cross-country skiing
Biathletes at the 1996 Asian Winter Games
Cross-country skiers at the 1990 Asian Winter Games
Cross-country skiers at the 1996 Asian Winter Games
Asian Games gold medalists for China
Asian Games silver medalists for China
Asian Games bronze medalists for China
Medalists at the 1990 Asian Winter Games
Medalists at the 1996 Asian Winter Games